The Crescent Star Party is a  political party in Indonesia.

History
The party's origins go back to the banning of the Islamic Masyumi Party by Sukarno in 1960. After the ban, supporters and followers of the party established the Crescent Star Family (Keluarga Bulan Bintang) to continue to press for the implementation of Sharia law and Islamic teaching in Indonesia. Following the fall of Sukarno and the transition to the New Order in which Suharto came to power, members of the organization wanted to revive the Masyumi Party, but this was not allowed by the new regime. In the 1970s, in a meeting in Malang, a new party called Parmusi (Partai Muslimin Indonesia, Muslim Party of Indonesia) was formed. It came fourth in the 1971 legislative elections. In 1973, the party was forced to merge with other Islamic parties into the United Development Party. With the fall of Suharto in 1998, supporters of Masyumi decided to establish a new party. The original plan was to use Masyumi name again, but after consideration, they settled on the name "Crescent Star Party". The party's first leader was Yusril Ihza Mahendra, a lawyer and former speechwriter for President Suharto.

Electoral record
The party stood in the 1999 elections, winning 1.9% of the vote and 13 seats in the People's Representative Council. Yusril was appointed justice and law minister. In mid-2000 internal conflict broke out in the party over Yusril's acceptance of financial assistance from former president Jusuf Habibie. It ended with party member Hartono Mardjono establishing a rival Crescent Star Party. After losing a court case, Hartono then established he Indonesian Islamic Party (Partai Islam Indonesia), but this failed to qualify for the 2004 elections.  In these elections, the Crescent Star Party won 2.6% of the popular vote and 11 seats. Yusril was later replaced by Malem Sambat Kaban. In the 2009 legislative election, the party won 1.8 percent of the votes, less than the 2.5 percent electoral threshold, meaning it lost all its seats in the People's Representative Council.

Party platform
The party wants to realize an Islamic way of life. Its mission is to build a society and nation that is developed, highly independent in nature, intelligent, just, democratic and that will play a role in bringing about world peace based on the values of Islam.

Election results

Legislative election results

Presidential election results

Note: Bold text suggests the party's member

References

 
1998 establishments in Indonesia
Islamism in Indonesia
Political parties established in 1998
Political parties in Indonesia
Islamic political parties in Indonesia
Social conservative parties